The Suez Canal overhead powerline crossing is a major electrical power line built across the Suez Canal in 1998, located near Suez, Egypt. It is designed for two 500 kV circuits.

The pylons each have four crossarms: three for the conductors and one for catching the conductors in case of an insulator string failure.

Significant developments in the region
The crossing was part of a major drive to develop the areas surrounding the Suez Canal, including other projects such as the Ahmed Hamdi Tunnel under the Suez Canal (completed in 1981), the El Ferdan Railway Bridge, and the Suez Canal Bridge (completed in 2001).

It was constructed by a consortium between STFA Enerkom and Siemens.

See also

Electric power transmission
List of towers

References

Energy infrastructure completed in 1998
Electric power infrastructure in Egypt
Buildings and structures in Egypt
Powerline river crossings
Overead Line Crossing, Suez Canal